Akina may refer to:

 Akina, a character in the 3D-CG Hong Kong donghua TV series Zentrix
 Mount Akina, name for Mount Haruna in the Initial D series of manga and anime
 Akina, New Zealand, suburb of Hastings City, in the Hawke's Bay Region of New Zealand's North Island
 Akina Hiizumi, a character in the Japanese manga series Yozakura Quartet

People
 Duane Akina (born 1956), defensive backs coach
 Joseph Apukai Akina (1856–1920), lawyer, politician and minister of the Kingdom of Hawaii
 Akina Pau (born 1974), fencer from Hong Kong, China
 Akina Shirt (born 1994), First Nations singer known for her performances in the Cree language
 Yunsi (1680–1726; also Akina), Manchu prince of the Qing dynasty in China

Japan
 Akina (born 1999), member of the five-person Japanese girl group Faky
 Akina Minami (born 1989), Japanese gravure idol and tarento
 Akina Miyazato, member of the five-girl Japanese pop idol group Folder 5
 Akina Nakamori (born 1965), Japanese singer and actress